Sophie Blanc (born 20 February 1968) is a French lawyer and politician from National Rally (RN) who has represented the 1st constituency of Pyrénées-Orientales in the National Assembly since 2022.

Blanc holds a PhD in law and was a lawyer at the bar of Perpignan for over twenty years. She was elected as a regional councilor in 2015 and was a community advisor to the mayor's office in Perpignan.

See also 

 List of deputies of the 16th National Assembly of France

References 

1968 births
Living people
Deputies of the 16th National Assembly of the French Fifth Republic
21st-century French women politicians
Women members of the National Assembly (France)
Members of Parliament for Pyrénées-Orientales
National Rally (France) politicians
Politicians from Toulouse